KYYK (98.3 FM) is a radio station broadcasting a hybrid Classic country format, with an emphasis on Texas Country artists. Licensed to Palestine, Texas, United States, the station serves the Tyler-Jacksonville area. The station is currently owned by Tiffany Spearman and Kristi Spearman, through licensee Zula Com, LLC, and is an affiliate of the High Plains Radio Network.

History
The station was assigned the call sign KYYK on 1981-11-18. On 1987-07-01, the station changed its call sign to KNET-FM and on 1987-09-21, back to the current KYYK.

On April 6, 2022, KYYK shifted its playlist to mostly classic country and Texas/Red Dirt country.

References

External links
 
 

YYK
Country radio stations in the United States
Radio stations established in 1981